Radio 1's Live Lounge – Volume 6 is a compilation album consisting of live tracks played on Fearne Cotton's BBC Radio 1 show, both cover versions and original songs. The album was released on 31 October 2011, and is the seventh in the series of Live Lounge albums.

Track listing

Charts

References

2011 compilation albums
2011 live albums
Live Lounge
Covers albums
Rhino Entertainment compilation albums
Sony Music compilation albums
Universal Music Group compilation albums
Universal Music TV albums

simple:Radio 1's Live Lounge